The men's K-2 1000 metres sprint canoeing event at the 2020 Summer Olympics took place on 4 and 5 August 2021 at the Sea Forest Waterway. At least 20 canoeists (10 boats of 2) from at least 10 nations competed.

Background
This was the 20th appearance of the event, one of four events that have been held at every Summer Olympics since the introduction of canoeing in 1936.

The reigning World Champions are Max Hoff and Jacob Schopf of Germany, who have been named to the German team. The reigning Olympic champions are Max Rendschmidt and Marcus Gross, also of Germany; Rendschmidt has been named to the team, but Gross has not.

Qualification

A National Olympic Committee (NOC) could qualify one place in the event, though could enter up to 2 boats if it earned enough quota places through other men's kayak events. A total of 13 qualification places were available, initially allocated as follows:

 6 places awarded through the 2019 ICF Canoe Sprint World Championships
 3 places awarded to 3 different continents (excluding Europe) through the World Championships, which are then competed for at continental tournaments
 1 places awarded through a European continental tournament

Qualifying places were awarded to the NOC, not to the individual canoeist who earned the place.

The three continental spots were awarded to the Americas (#14 Canada), Oceania (#15 New Zealand), and Asia (#21 Japan); Africa had the lowest next-ranked team (#24 South Africa). The continental tournaments were won by Canada (via World Championship rather than continental tournament, which was cancelled), China, Hungary, and New Zealand. The World Championships places were allocated as follows:

Continental places:

Nations with women's kayak quota spots from the K-1 200 metres, K-1 500 metres, or K-4 500 metres could enter (additional) boats as well.

Competition format
Sprint canoeing uses a four-round format for events with at least 11 boats, with heats, quarterfinals, semifinals, and finals. The specifics of the progression format depend on the number of boats ultimately entered.

The course is a flatwater course 9 metres wide. The name of the event describes the particular format within sprint canoeing. The "K" format means a kayak, with the canoeist sitting, using a double-bladed paddle to paddle, and steering with a foot-operated rudder (as opposed to a canoe, with a kneeling canoeist, single-bladed paddle, and no rudder). The "2" is the number of canoeists in each boat. The "1000 metres" is the distance of each race.

Schedule
The event was held over two consecutive days, with two rounds per day. All sessions started at 9:30 a.m. local time, though there are multiple events with races in each session.

Results

Heats
Progression System: 1st-2nd to SF, rest to QF.

Heat 1

Heat 2

Heat 3

Quarterfinals
Progression System: 1st-3rd to SF, rest to Final B.

Quarterfinal 1

Quarterfinal 2

Semifinals
Progression System: 1st-4th to Final A, rest to Final B.

Semifinal 1

Semifinal 2

Finals

Final A

Final B

References

Men's K-2 1000 metres
Men's events at the 2020 Summer Olympics